The 1960 Italian Grand Prix was a Formula One motor race held at Monza on 4 September 1960. It was race 9 of 10 in the 1960 World Championship of Drivers and race 8 of 9 in the 1960 International Cup for Formula One Manufacturers. The race was won by American driver Phil Hill driving a Ferrari 246 F1.

Race summary
The 1960 season had been a frustrating one for Ferrari's Formula 1 program as they campaigned their obsolete Dino 246, a front engined car as the rear engined design established supremacy. Due to the boycott by British teams, the championship had already been decided for Jack Brabham and Ferrari had gone without a victory. Seeing an opportunity, the Italian organizers decided to maximize Ferrari's one advantage —straightline speed— by using the combined Monza road and banked oval circuit, making the fast Monza even faster.

Citing the fragility of their cars and the dangers of the banking, the major British factory teams of the day—Lotus, BRM, and Cooper, all boycotted the event, leading to a cobbled together field of private entrants and Formula 2 cars.

The race was a processional affair, with Ginther leading at the start and eventually being overtaken by Hill. The pair with teammate Willy Mairesse raced on to a rare 1–2–3 team result for Scuderia Ferrari. The boycott also allowed Scuderia Castellotti to score its only world championship points with Giulio Cabianca finishing fourth in his Cooper T51, two laps behind Hill and ahead of Scuderia Ferrari's fourth entry, Wolfgang von Trips in a 1.5 L-engined (conforming to F2 regulations) Ferrari 156 F2 car.

It was the first victory by an American driver in a Grand Prix since Jimmy Murphy in 1921, and, excluding the Indy 500, the first by an American in the Formula One  World Championship. 

It was the last Formula One World Championship victory by a front-engined car, although the Ferguson P99 won the non-championship Gold Cup at Oulton Park in 1961.

Classification

Qualifying

Race

Championship standings after the race

Drivers' Championship standings

Constructors' Championship standings

 Notes: Only the top five positions are included for both sets of standings. Only the best 6 results counted towards each Championship. Numbers without parentheses are Championship points; numbers in parentheses are total points scored.

References

Italian Grand Prix
Italian Grand Prix
European Grand Prix
1960 in Italian motorsport